The Boeing Company is an American multinational corporation that designs, manufactures, and sells airplanes, rotorcraft, rockets, satellites, telecommunications equipment, and missiles worldwide. The company also provides leasing and product support services. Boeing is among the largest global aerospace manufacturers; it is the third-largest defense contractor in the world based on 2020 revenue, and is the largest exporter in the United States by dollar value. Boeing stock is included in the Dow Jones Industrial Average. Boeing is incorporated in Delaware.

Boeing was founded by William Boeing in Seattle, Washington, on July 15, 1916. The present corporation is the result of the merger of Boeing with McDonnell Douglas on August 1, 1997. Then chairman and CEO of Boeing, Philip M. Condit, assumed those roles in the combined company, while Harry Stonecipher, former CEO of McDonnell Douglas, became president and COO.

The Boeing Company's corporate headquarters is in Chicago, Illinois as of 2022. In May 2022, the company announced plans to move its headquarters to Arlington, Virginia in the near future. Boeing is organized into four primary divisions: Boeing Commercial Airplanes (BCA); Boeing Defense, Space & Security (BDS); Boeing Global Services; and Boeing Capital. In 2021, Boeing recorded  62.3billion in sales. Boeing is ranked 54th on the Fortune magazine "Fortune 500" list (2020), and ranked 121st on the "Fortune Global 500" list (2020).

In 2019, Boeing's global reputation, commercial business, and financial rating suffered after the 737 MAX fleet was grounded worldwide following two fatal crashes in late 2018 and early 2019. In September 2022, Boeing was ordered to pay $200m over charges of misleading investors about safety issues related to these crashes. In March 2023, Boeing disputed in court filings that the victims of Ethiopian Airlines Flight 302 experienced any pain and suffering leading up to the crash.

History

The Boeing Company was started in 1916, when American lumber industrialist William E. Boeing founded Aero Products Company in Seattle, Washington. Shortly before doing so, he and Conrad Westervelt created the "B&W" seaplane. In 1917, the organization was renamed Boeing Airplane Company, with William Boeing forming Boeing Airplane & Transport Corporation in 1928. In 1929, the company was renamed United Aircraft and Transport Corporation, followed by the acquisition of several aircraft makers such as Avion, Chance Vought, Sikorsky Aviation, Stearman Aircraft, Pratt & Whitney, and Hamilton Metalplane.

In 1931, the group merged its four smaller airlines into United Airlines. In 1934, aircraft manufacturing was required to be separate from air transportation. Therefore, Boeing Airplane Company became one of three major groups to arise from the dissolution of United Aircraft and Transport; the other two entities were United Aircraft (later United Technologies) and United Airlines.

In 1960, the company bought Vertol Aircraft Corporation, which at the time, was the biggest independent manufacturer of helicopters. During the 1960s and 1970s, the company diversified into industries such as outer space travel, marine craft, agriculture, energy production and transit systems.

In 1995, Boeing partnered with Russian, Ukrainian, and Anglo-Norwegian organizations to create Sea Launch, a company providing commercial launch services sending satellites to geostationary orbit from floating platforms. In 2000, Boeing acquired the satellite segment of Hughes Electronics.

In December 1996, Boeing announced its intention to merge with McDonnell Douglas, and following regulatory approval, this was completed on August 4, 1997. This had been delayed by objections from the European Commission, which ultimately placed three conditions on the merger: termination of exclusivity agreements with three US airlines, separate accounts would be maintained for the McDonnell-Douglas civil aircraft business, and some defense patents were to be made available to competitors. In 2020, Quartz reported that after the merger there was a "clash of corporate cultures, where Boeing's engineers and McDonnell Douglas's bean-counters went head-to-head", which the latter won, and that this may have contributed to the events leading up to the 737 Max crash crisis.

The corporate headquarters were moved from Seattle to Chicago in 2001. In 2018, Boeing opened its first factory in Europe at Sheffield, UK, reinforced by a research partnership with The University of Sheffield.

In May 2020, the company cut over 12,000 jobs due to the drop in air travel during the COVID-19 pandemic with plans for a total 10% cut of its workforce or approximately 16,000 positions. In July 2020, Boeing reported a loss of $2.4 billion as a result of the pandemic and the grounding of its 737 MAX aircraft, and that it was in response planning to make more job and production cuts. On August 18, 2020, CEO Dave Calhoun announced further job cuts; on October 28, 2020, nearly 30,000 employees were laid off, as the airplane manufacturer was increasingly losing money due to the COVID-19 pandemic.

The Boeing 777X, the largest capacity twinjet, made its maiden flight on January 25, 2020. Following an incident during flight testing, the estimated first delivery of the aircraft was delayed until 2024.

After two fatal crashes of the Boeing 737 MAX narrow-body passenger airplanes in 2018 and 2019, aviation regulators and airlines around the world grounded all 737 MAX airliners. A total of 387 aircraft were grounded. Boeing's reputation, business, and financial rating has suffered after these groundings, questioning Boeing's strategy, governance, and focus on profits and cost efficiency.

In May 2022, Boeing announced plans to move its global headquarters from Chicago to Arlington, Virginia, a suburb of Washington, D.C. The company said that this decision was made in part due to the region's "proximity to our customers and stakeholders, and its access to world-class engineering and technical talent."

In February 2023, Boeing announced plans for laying off approximately 2,000 of its workers from finances and human resources.

Divisions

The corporation's four main divisions are Boeing Commercial Airplanes (BCA), Boeing Defense, Space & Security (BDS), Boeing Global Services, and Boeing Capital.

Boeing Commercial Airplanes (BCA) builds commercial aircraft including the 737, 747, 767, 777, and 787 along with freighter and business jet variants of most. The division employs nearly 35,000 people, many working at the company's manufacturing facilities in Everett and Renton, Washington (outside of Seattle), and South Carolina.

Boeing Defense, Space & Security (BDS) builds military aircraft, satellites, spacecraft, and space launch vehicles.

Boeing Global Services provides aftermarket support, such as maintenance and upgrades, to customers who purchase equipment from BCA, BDS, or from other manufacturers.

Boeing Capital provides customers financing for the products and services from the company's other divisions.

Environmental record
In 2006, the UCLA Center for Environmental Risk Reduction released a study showing that Boeing's Santa Susana Field Laboratory, a site that was a former Rocketdyne test and development site in the Simi Hills of eastern Ventura County in Southern California, had been contaminated by Rocketdyne with toxic and radioactive waste. Boeing agreed to a cleanup agreement with the EPA in 2017. Clean-up studies and lawsuits are in progress.

On July 19, 2022, Boeing announced a renewed partnership with Mitsubishi to innovate carbon-neutral and sustainable solutions.

Jet biofuels

The airline industry is responsible for about 11% of greenhouse gases emitted by the U.S. transportation sector. Aviation's share of the greenhouse gas emissions was poised to grow, as air travel increases and ground vehicles use more alternative fuels like ethanol and biodiesel. Boeing estimates that biofuels could reduce flight-related greenhouse-gas emissions by 60 to 80%. The solution blends algae fuels with existing jet fuel.

Boeing executives said the company was collaborating with Brazilian biofuels maker Tecbio, Aquaflow Bionomic of New Zealand, and other fuel developers around the world. As of 2007, Boeing had tested six fuels from these companies, and expected to test 20 fuels "by the time we're done evaluating them". Boeing also joined other aviation-related members in the Algal Biomass Organization (ABO) in June 2008.

Air New Zealand and Boeing are researching the jatropha plant to see if it is a sustainable alternative to conventional fuel. A two-hour test flight using a 50–50 mixture of the new biofuel with Jet A-1 in a Rolls-Royce RB-211 engine of a 747-400 was completed on December 30, 2008. The engine was then removed to be studied to identify any differences between the Jatropha blend and regular Jet A1. No effects on performances were found.

On August 31, 2010, Boeing worked with the U.S. Air Force to test the Boeing C-17 running on 50% JP-8, 25% Hydro-treated Renewable Jet fuel, and 25% of Fischer–Tropsch fuel with successful results.

Electric propulsion
For NASA's N+3 future airliner program, Boeing has determined that hybrid electric engine technology is by far the best choice for its subsonic design. Hybrid electric propulsion has the potential to shorten takeoff distance and reduce noise. Boeing created a team to study electric propulsion in future generation of subsonic commercial aircraft. SUGAR for Subsonic Ultra Green Aircraft Research includes BR&T, Boeing Commercial Airplanes, General Electric, and Georgia Tech. There are five main concepts the team is reviewing. SUGAR-Free and Refined SUGAR, are two concepts based on conventional aircraft similar to the 737. SUGAR High and SUGAR Volt, are both high-span, strut-based wing concepts. The final concept is SUGAR Ray, which is a wing-body hybrid. The SUGAR Volt concept has resulted in a drop in fuel burn by more than 70 percent and a reduction of total energy use by 55 percent. This reduction is the result of adding an electric battery gas turbine hybrid propulsion system.

Political contributions, federal contracts, advocacy

In 2008 and 2009, Boeing was second on the list of Top 100 US Federal Contractors, with contracts totaling 22 billion and 23 billion respectively.  Between 1995 and early 2021, the company agreed to pay 4.3 billion to settle 84 instances of misconduct, including 615 million in 2006 in relation to illegal hiring of government officials and improper use of proprietary information.

Boeing secured the highest-ever tax breaks at the state level in 2013.

Boeing's spent 16.9 million on lobbying expenditures in 2009. In the 2008 presidential election, Barack Obama "was by far the biggest recipient of campaign contributions from Boeing employees and executives, hauling in 197,000 – five times as much as John McCain, and more than the top eight Republicans combined".

Boeing has a corporate citizenship program centered on charitable contributions in five areas: education, health, human services, environment, the arts, culture, and civic engagement. In 2011, Boeing spent 147.3 million in these areas through charitable grants and business sponsorships.  In February 2012, Boeing Global Corporate Citizenship partnered with the Insight Labs to develop a new model for foundations to more effectively lead the sectors they serve.

The company is a member of the U.S. Global Leadership Coalition, a Washington D.C.-based coalition of more than 400 major companies and NGOs that advocate a larger International Affairs Budget, which funds American diplomatic and development efforts abroad. A series of U.S. diplomatic cables show how U.S. diplomats and senior politicians intervene on behalf of Boeing to help boost the company's sales.

In 2007 and 2008, the company benefited from over 10 billion of long-term loan guarantees, helping finance the purchase of their commercial aircraft in countries including Brazil, Canada, Ireland, and the United Arab Emirates, from the Export-Import Bank of the United States, some 65% of the total loan guarantees the bank made in the period.

Criticism 
In December 2011, the non-partisan organization Public Campaign criticized Boeing for spending 52.29 million on lobbying and not paying taxes during 2008–2010, instead getting 178 million in tax rebates, despite making a profit of 9.7 billion, laying off 14,862 workers since 2008, and increasing executive pay by 31% to 41.9 million in 2010 for its top five executives.

The firm has also been criticized for supplying and profiting from wars, including the war in Yemen where its missiles were found to be used for indiscriminate attacks, killing many civilians.

Boeing has been accused of unethical practices (in violation of the Procurement Integrity Act) while attempting to submit a revised bid to NASA for their lunar landing project.

Financials 

For the fiscal year 2017, Boeing reported earnings of 8.191billion, with annual revenue of 93.392billion, a 1.25% decline over the previous fiscal cycle. Boeing's shares traded at over $209 per share, and its market capitalization was valued at over 206.6billion.

Between 2010 and 2018, Boeing increased its operating cash flow from $3 to $15.3billion, sustaining its share price, by negotiating advance payments from customers and delaying payments to its suppliers. This strategy is sustainable only as long as orders are good and delivery rates are increasing.

From 2013 to 2019, Boeing spent over $60 billion on dividends and stock buybacks, twice as much as the development costs of the 787.

In 2020, Boeing's revenue was $11.8 billion as a result of the pandemic slump. Due to higher sales in other divisions and an influx in deliveries of commercial jetliners in 2021, revenue increased by 44%, reaching nearly $17 billion.

Employment numbers
The company's employment totals are listed below.

Approximately 1.5% of Boeing employees are in the Technical Fellowship program, a program through which Boeing's top engineers and scientists set technical direction for the company. The average salary at Boeing is $76,784, reported by former employees.

Corporate governance
In 2022, Rory Kennedy made a documentary film, Downfall: The Case Against Boeing, streamed by Netflix. She said about the 21st-century history of Boeing "There were many decades when Boeing did extraordinary things by focusing on excellence and safety and ingenuity. Those three virtues were seen as the key to profit. It could work, and beautifully. And then they were taken over by a group that decided Wall Street was the end-all, be-all."

On May 5, 2022, Boeing announced that it would be moving its headquarters from Chicago to Arlington, Virginia in the Washington, D.C. metropolitan area. Additionally, it plans to add a research and technology center in Northern Virginia.

Board
, Boeing is headed by a President who also serves as the chief executive officer. The roles of chairman of the board and CEO were separated in October 2019.

Past leadership

See also

 Boeing Everett Factory - main production facility for commercial widebody aircraft
 Competition between Airbus and Boeing
 Future of Flight Aviation Center & Boeing Tour – Corporate public museum
 United Aircraft Corporation
 United States Air Force Plant 42

References

Further reading
 Cloud, Dana L. We Are the Union: Democratic Unionism and Dissent at Boeing. Urbana, IL: University of Illinois Press, 2011. 
 Greider, William. One World, Ready or Not: The Manic Logic of Global Capitalism. London: Penguin Press, 1998. 
 Reed, Polly. Capitalist Family Values: Gender, Work, and Corporate Culture at Boeing. Lincoln, NE: University of Nebraska Press, 2015.

External links

 
 
 

 
1916 establishments in Washington (state)
American companies established in 1916
Collier Trophy recipients
Companies in the Dow Jones Industrial Average
Companies listed on the New York Stock Exchange
Defense companies of the United States
History of Seattle
Manufacturing companies established in 1916
Multinational companies headquartered in the United States
Space Act Agreement companies
Technology companies established in 1916
Vehicle manufacturing companies established in 1916
Wind turbine manufacturers